Frères des Hommes France (FdH) is a secular non-profit aid organization. It was recognized as promoting public interest in 1998 and involves 250 members and 250 volunteers spread within 13 local teams.

Frères des Hommes supports projects of sustainable development in Asia, Africa and Latin America on the following issues: small-scale agriculture, social economy and democratic citizenship.

History

Upon first seeing Calcutta in 1965, Armand Marquisel was shocked by the sight of a "capital of poverty". After returning to France, he decided to create the NGO Frères des Hommes. He recruited volunteers willing to go to India with him and create the first Frères des Hommes center in Calcutta, where they fed the children. At its beginning, the NGO was organized by different Frères des Hommes centers in Africa, Asia and Latin America, where the volunteers worked. In the 1970s, they were already more than 100 all over the three continents. In 1980, the Charter of the NGO launched a new functioning that established a partnership with local organizations: the assistantship developed during the first years disappeared to a real cooperative work. This original method guided, from then on, all actions carried out by Frères des Hommes.

In 2011, Frères des Hommes celebrated its 45th anniversary.

Philosophy

Frères des Hommes bases its activities on a long term partnership with its representatives from underdeveloped countries (non governmental organizations, associations, movements…). This imminence implies sharing ideals and goals, supporting new or existing initiatives, as well as co-responsibility. The projects supported by the NGO are designed and set up by local communities, with the help of local organizations.

Partners and some actions around the world

Small-scale agriculture

Peasant Papaya Movement (MPP) in Haiti supports peasant families in order to develop the farming sector in the Central Plateau of Haiti. The project works to restore and develop the familial agriculture (2010–2013);Trust Rural Development (TRD) in India trains peasant families dedicated to agroecology. In collaboration with Frères des Hommes they boost the training of these families (2009–2011);
[[Landless Workers' Movement|Movement of the Landless (MST)]] in Brazil fights to defend the social, economic and political rights of landless peasants. The action helped to reinforce this Movement (1995–2003);Adenya and Duhamic-Adri in Rwanda. Adenya is an organization dedicated to Nyabimata’s development, in the South-west of Rwanda. Duhamic-Adri is an organization for integrated rural development. These two partners work together with Frères des Hommes proposing cultural and agricultural alternatives (2013–2015);
Farmers and Breeders Peasant Cooperation (Coraca Protal) in Bolivia, helps the reconstruction of peasant communities. Coraca-Protal has taken part in two projects supported by Frères des Hommes and made in collaboration with other Bolivian partners: The social economy aid to peasants (2013) and the sustainable tourism towards communities (2008–2010);Ekta Parishad in India works to achieve the autonomy of the poorest sectors of the population, especially due to land access difficulties. In collaboration with Frères des Hommes, they helped smallholder farmers, landless workers and tribes to fight for their rights to access natural resources(2006–2008);
PDRN in Philippines helps victims of environmental disasters and trains citizens in the risk management field.

Social economy

Union of Méckhé Peasants Association (UGPM) in Senegal supports women in Méckhé, improving handmade peanut plant and millet and their commercialization. Frères des Hommes and its partner develop, both in urban and rural areas, the commercialization of high quality peanut plant oil produced by Méckhé women (2011–2015);Kora-PRD in Senegal walks with carpenters in their fight against school expulsion and young unemployment. This project has developed a new program focused on technical and professional training (2011–2012);
Feminine entrepreneurship Association (Apef) in the Democratic Republic of the Congo gives women means to make a living from their work, know and defend their rights and take an active role in the local political arena. In the region of Bukavu, these two organizations have developed economic and educational activities carried out by women and for women that do not have enough means (2009–2011);Red Tusoco walks with peasant communities to carry out sustainable tourism activities that are respectful of human beings and nature (2008–2010);
CIOEC Cochabamba in Bolivia coordinates Kampesino, a caring company that supports the transformation and commercialization of goods produced by farming organizations. With Frères des Hommes they worked to promote a consortium model to commercialize peasant’s farming products (2013);
Adenya and Duhamic-Adri in Rwanda help the strengthening of economical activities in rural areas. The goal of the project was to develop and promote wood and forge homemade work  (2009–2011);
Adec-ATC in Peru manages employment issues, supporting the most vulnerable sectors;
Coraca-Protal in Bolivia, is a peasant organization that goes into action and leads a global local development program in the region of Cochabamba, in the center of Bolivia, basically organizing the production, transformation and commercialization of food crops;
Cenca in Peru walks with Lima poorest people, it develops economic activities for them and it helps them to become collective subjects. The project has carried out a fair trade micro-program(2013);
PhilNet-RDI in Philippines is a militant alternative Philippine network that works to reinforce rural economic activities.

Democratic citizenship

Union of Farmer Groups of Méckhé (UGPM) in Senegal carries out supporting activities to provide inputs to training and socialization for young farmers in the Thiès region;Graim in Senegal is an association that works with decentralization and with the health and education sectors, in the Thiès region. Together they created Radio Coorkaat in the Thiès High plateaum in west Senegal (2009–2011);
Fedesi in Ivory Coast leads the organization and the development of economic activities for workers in the informal sector who carry out their duties in unsafe conditions;
Cieric in Cuba, works for social development and walks with the people to encourage them exercise their citizenship, organizing artistic and socio cultural activities;
Cresfed in Haiti trains civil and public authorities actors for the exercise of democracy;
Fedina in India walks with the marginalized population so they can defend their rights and become actors in their own emancipation. (2008). Also, we worked to guarantee the application of the  “National Rural Employment Guarantee Act” (NREGA) to the benefit of rural populations (2009–2011); http://fedina.org/?page_id=1036
Consortium for the land reform (KPA) in Indonesia works for the attainment of the Indonesian land reform, and gives to the marginalized populations the means to defend their right to access the land. Together we fought against poverty and for a better distribution of the country’s natural resources (2009);Pergerakan in Indonesia is a group that walks with social movements emerged from the working classes, especially rural
Piler in Pakistan is a center for economic, social and cultural promotion of vulnerable workers. It also aims to provide them with an education.

References

External links
Official website

Non-profit organizations based in France